"Save It for Later" is a 1982 song written and recorded by British ska band the Beat (known in the United States and Canada as the English Beat). The song was released as a single from the band's third and final studio album, Special Beat Service (1982), finding moderate chart success in Britain.

Written by Beat guitarist Dave Wakeling before the band was founded, the song nearly went unreleased due to opposition from bassist David Steele. After pressure from Wakeling and the record company, the song was ultimately recorded for the band's third studio album. The song has since become one of the band's most famous tracks and has been featured in various soundtracks and compilation albums.

"Save It for Later" is also notable for its unique tuning, which was achieved accidentally. The track's lyrics highlight the suggestive double entendre of the song's title.

Background
"Save It for Later" was written by Beat guitarist Dave Wakeling as a teenager before the founding of the band. The song was then attempted at band rehearsals. Although Wakeling said he "always liked the song before [he] was in the group," the song was initially rejected by bassist David Steele for "being too 'rock,' too 'old wave.

By the time of the band's third studio album, however, Steele had been unable to provide enough material and the record company began pressuring the band to record "Save It for Later". Wakeling recalled, "It was only really when the record company insisted [on releasing the track], and I got a bit of courage and said, 'Well, look, if it’s not on our record I’d just rather go and record it myself and bring it out. Steele continued to refuse to play on the backing track, leading Wakeling and drummer Everett Morton to record a basic track until the rest of the band relented.

Music and lyrics
"Save It for Later" features a unique DADAAD tuning that Wakeling stumbled upon; he explained, "I had tried to tune my guitar to DADGAD to play along with Jon (sic) Martyn tunes in late 70's before the English Beat started. I accidentally came up with DADAAD, so I made up my own chord shapes and enjoyed the hypnotic drone of the tuning on my national steel for hour after hour." Due to the song's atypical tuning, Who guitarist Pete Townshend called Wakeling to ask how to play the song:

Townshend subsequently performed the song at his Deep End concerts.

Wakeling described the lyrical theme of "Save It for Later" as "about turning from a teenager to someone in their 20s." The title of the song also served as a double entendre—Wakeling explained, "It started off as a dirty schoolboy joke. The phrase 'save it for later' is meant to be 'save it,' comma, 'fellator.'"

Release and reception
"Save It for Later" was released on Special Beat Service in 1982. The song was also released as a single, reaching number 47 on the UK Singles Chart.  In the US, along with the track, "Sole Salvation", "Save It for Later" went to number 58 on the Billboard Dance/Disco Top 80 chart.

"Save It for Later" remains one of the Beat's most acclaimed songs. Wakeling acknowledged the song's success, saying, "[The track] actually ended up earning about a third of our catalogue's publishing money, nowadays." According to Wakeling, Pete Townshend  (who covered the song on multiple occasions) described the song as "one of [his] favorite songs in [his] whole life." Counting Crows lead vocalist Adam Duritz named it his perfect summer song, saying, "There's just something about the joy of the song ... It just seems so Technicolor to me." Pearl Jam regularly performs the song live in a medley with their song "Better Man."

The track has appeared in Kingpin (1996), Since You've Been Gone (1998), Big Daddy (1999), Sky High (2005), Funny People (2009), Hot Tub Time Machine (2010), Spider-Man: Homecoming (2017), and Like Father (2018). It also features in the Season 1 finale of Love, Once Upon a Time in the episode "Wake Up Call". A cover of the song by Seattle alternative rock band Harvey Danger appears in the film 200 Cigarettes (1999).

References

External links
 

1982 songs
1982 singles
The Beat (British band) songs
Song recordings produced by Bob Sargeant
Jangle pop songs